Bahla is a town, located 40 km away from Nizwa, and about 200 km from Oman's capital Muscat which lies in the Ad Dakhiliyah Governorate of Oman. It is notable as the home of one of the oldest fortresses in the country, the 13th century Bahla Fort which is a UNESCO World Heritage Site. The fortress and the town are enclosed by extensive remnants of a 12-km long fortified wall. Most buildings are constructed of traditional mud brick, many of them are hundreds of years old.

A short distance beyond Bahla lies the Castle of Jabreen, a massive three-story structure built during Al Ya'ruba dynasty in the mid of 17th century. The castle is an example of Islamic architecture with wooden inscriptions and paintings on its ceilings.

Pottery in Bahla
Pottery in Bahla dates back to as early as 2500 BC.  The clay used comes from the wadi (river bed). Men trample on this to make the clay pliable so it can be worked on. After the object is finished, it is placed in a kiln to be fired.

Climate

Gallery

See also

 List of cities in Oman

References

External links 

 https://web.archive.org/web/20051225161437/http://www.nizwa.net/heritage/wonderloop/wonderloop.html
 Bahla Fort - A Virtual Experience
 http://www.omantripper.com/jabreen-castle/
 http://www.omantourism.gov.om/wps/portal/mot/tourism/oman/home/experiences/culture/castle/!ut/p/a1/04_Sj9CPykssy0xPLMnMz0vMAfGjzOLN_Nx8AlxdDA38LQwNDDyDLXzNgoOdjQ0CTfSDU_P0C7IdFQElpcDA/
 https://whc.unesco.org/en/list/433

 
Populated places in Oman
Ad Dakhiliyah Governorate
World Heritage Sites in Oman